Rosa Rosen (1916–2004) was an Argentine stage, television and film actress. Born in Buenos Aires of German and Russian descent, she made her stage debut in 1933 and her first film the following year.

Selected filmography
 Loco lindo (1936)
 Los Pagares de Mendieta (1939)
 Captain Poison (1943)
 When Spring Makes a Mistake (1944)
 The New Bell (1950)

References

Bibliography 
 Finkielman, Jorge. The Film Industry in Argentina: An Illustrated Cultural History. McFarland, 2003.

External links 
 

1916 births
2004 deaths
Argentine stage actresses
Argentine film actresses
People from Buenos Aires
20th-century Argentine actresses
Argentine people of German descent
Argentine people of Russian descent